The 2014–15 season was Hellas Verona Football Club's second consecutive season in Serie A, after being promoted at the end of the 2012–13 Serie B season. The club competed in Serie A, finishing 13th (three places below the previous season's 10th-place finish), and in the Coppa Italia, where they were eliminated in the Round of 16.

Players

Squad information

Competitions

Serie A

League table

Results summary

Results by round

Matches

Coppa Italia

Statistics

Appearances and goals

|-
! colspan="10" style="background:#dcdcdc; text-align:center"| Goalkeepers

|-
! colspan="10" style="background:#dcdcdc; text-align:center"| Defenders

|-
! colspan="10" style="background:#dcdcdc; text-align:center"| Midfielders

|-
! colspan="10" style="background:#dcdcdc; text-align:center"| Forwards

|-
! colspan="10" style="background:#dcdcdc; text-align:center"| Players transferred out during the season

References

Hellas Verona F.C. seasons
Hellas Verona